The women's cycling omnium at the 2016 Olympic Games in Rio de Janeiro took place at the Rio Olympic Velodrome on 15 and 16 August.

The medals were presented by Adam Pengilly, IOC member, Great Britain and Harald Hansen, Member of the UCI Management Committee.

Competition format

The omnium competition consists of six events. During the first five events, riders receive points depending on their place, while during the final points race they can obtain points by winning sprints and taking laps during the event.

 Scratch race: a  scratch race, with all riders competing at once and first across the line winning.
 Individual pursuit: a  individual pursuit, with placing based on time.
 Elimination race: a "miss-and-out" elimination race, with the last rider in every sprint (each two laps) eliminated.
 Time trial: a  time trial, with two riders (starting opposite the track) riding at once.
 Points race: a  points race, with scoring for intermediate sprints as well as for lapping the pack.

Schedule 
All times are Brasília Time (UTC−03:00)

Overall standings 
Overall standings after the points race.

SR: Scratch race. IP: 3 km individual pursuit. ER: Elimination race.TT: 500m time trial. FL: 250m flying lap. PR: Points race.

Event results

Scratch race

Individual pursuit

Elimination race

Time trial

Flying lap

Points race

References

Women's Omnium
Cycling at the Summer Olympics – Women's omnium
Women's events at the 2016 Summer Olympics
Olymp